Cressida was a British progressive rock band, best known for its mellow, symphonic sound. Originally known as Charge, the band was active from 1968 to 1970, and recorded two albums for Vertigo.

Career
The roots of Cressida were sown in March 1968, when guitarist "Rock & Roll" John Heyworth answered an advertisement in Melody Maker, and later travelled to London to join The Dominators, a band whose situation he later described as "hopeless - until Angus Cullen applied for the lead singer spot". He and Heyworth hit it off immediately, and Heyworth was invited to stay at Cullen's family flat in Barkstone Gardens near Earl's Court. The pair settled down to some serious writing, eventually welcoming bassist Kevin McCarthy and drummer Iain Clark to the fold and now calling themselves Charge.

The band's early setlists included covers of songs by The Doors ("Spanish Caravan"), The Drifters ("Save The Last Dance For Me") and Spirit ("Fresh Garbage"), alongside original compositions by Cullen and Heyworth. In the Summer of 1969, shortly after returning from a German tour, the band's organist Lol Coker decided to leave, and moved back to Liverpool to marry his Swiss girlfriend and take over his father's business. He had stayed just long enough to play on the band's first demo, which got them a recording contract with Vertigo Records.

Peter Jennings then joined. "I was auditioned at the Roebuck pub in Chiswick, a place they sometimes used for rehearsals", he later remembered. "I imagine we ran through a 12-bar or two and possibly they tried me out on one of the numbers from their set, but anyway they liked the way I fitted in and I joined them that day". Jennings' previous musical experience included blues gigs playing 12-string guitar in tandem with ex-Paramounts pianist Andy Staines, and (in 1968–69) White Rabbit with drummer Ron Berg and guitarist Andy Rickell (a.k.a. Android Funnel). After White Rabbit came to an end, Jennings played with several short-lived bands.

At this point the band settled on the name Cressida. "None of the band considered Charge that wonderful a name. We decided after some discussion on a name taken from the William Shakespeare play Troilus and Cressida." Their first gigs as Cressida were in Germany, including the Star-Club in Hamburg sharing the bill with Colosseum and East Of Eden, in the Autumn of 1969. Their manager at the time, Mike Rosen, also drove their Transit van and, being a trumpet player (he later joined Mogul Thrash), occasionally joined the band on stage for some of their more extended numbers. But Rosen soon fell out with producer Ossie Byrne (of early Bee Gees fame), and from that point Mel Baister assumed managerial duties.

Other forays into Europe included a trip to Bratislava in November 1969, where they performed at the end of a week's competition between various bands from the Eastern bloc; a week supporting Black Sabbath at Brussels' Theatre 140; and a performance at the Open Circus (an event held in a large tent with lion taming, fire eating and other side shows) in Rouen, France, alongside Brian Auger, Barclay James Harvest, Man and Circus.

Cressida mostly played the university and college circuits, as well as London clubs such as the Speakeasy, Revolution, Blaises and the Marquee Club. The first LP was recorded at Wessex Studios with Byrne producing. It consisted of songs by either Cullen or Heyworth (who handled lead vocals on one), plus one contribution each by Jennings and Clark.

Cressida went through a difficult phase when Heyworth was forced to leave in early 1970. Around this time, the band recorded a more commercial track intended for single release, "Situation", but Vertigo chose not to issue it. The song is now available on a double-CD release of the band's complete recordings, The Vertigo Years Anthology 1969-1971.

Heyworth (who would contribute one last piece to the second album, although he did not play on it) was replaced by John Culley, who had been playing with Geno Washington. The new line-up recorded Cressida's second LP, Asylum, later in 1970 (again with Byrne producing, and with orchestral arrangements by Graeme Hall), but it was released posthumously in 1971, the band having broken up in September 1970. Noted jazz flautist Harold McNair guested on the song "Lisa" from the album.

After the band split up, Clark joined Uriah Heep. McCarthy joined Tranquility as rhythm guitarist and vocalist rather than bassist. Culley linked up with Black Widow and from 1981–1984, joined Colin Tench to launch the London six-piece progressive rock band Odin. In 2012 Culley guested on a debut album by Corvus Stone.

Heyworth died in January 2010. In 2011, three of the four surviving original members of the band, Angus Cullen, Iain Clark, and Kevin McCarthy got together again with Peter Jennings. The band were prompted to play a one-off live gig at The Underworld, Camden Town in London on 2 December 2011. Scottish guitarist Roger Niven joined Cressida and played the reunion gig. Coinciding with the show was the limited edition release of a vinyl album of previously unreleased demos that Cressida made before their first album, since made available in CD form as The Lost Tapes. In September 2013, they appeared at the Melloboat festival in Sweden, on which occasion Choices, a limited edition LP of archive material personally selected by Opeth's Mikael Åkerfeldt (a longtime fan of the band) was released.

The band never had any opportunity to play in the United States, since Mercury chose not to release either album in the US (their two albums were sold in the US as imports).

Band members
Angus Cullen - lead vocals, acoustic guitar, percussion (1968-1970)
Kevin McCarthy - bass (1968-1970)
Iain Clark - drums, percussion (1968-1970)
John Heyworth - guitars, vocals (1968–70)
Lol Coker - organ (1968–69)
Peter Jennings - organ, piano (1969–70)
John Culley - guitars (1970)
Roger Niven - guitars (2011–present)

Discography
1969 - Cressida (Vertigo)
"To Play Your Little Game" (Heyworth) 3:15
"Winter Is Coming Again" (Heyworth) 4:42
"Time For Bed" (Cullen) 2:18
"Cressida" (Cullen) 3:57
"Home And Where I Long To Be" (Heyworth) 4:04
"Depression" (Cullen) 5:02
"One Of A Group" (Jennings) 3:35
"Lights In My Mind" (Heyworth) 2:45
"The Only Earthman In Town" (Heyworth) 3:32
"Spring '69" (Cullen) 2:14
"Down Down" (Heyworth) 4:15
"Tomorrow Is a Whole New Day" (Clark) 5:19

1971 - Asylum (Vertigo)
"Asylum" (Cullen) 3:31
"Munich" (Jennings) 9:30
"Goodbye Post Office Tower Goodbye" (Cullen) 2:47
"Survivor" (Cullen) 1:32
"Reprieved" (Jennings) 2:29
"Lisa" (Cullen) 5:05
"Summer Weekend of A Lifetime" (Cullen) 3:20
"Let Them Come When They Will" (Heyworth) 11:46

2012 - Trapped In Time - The Lost Tapes (Esoteric)
(All but 4 tracks of this release feature the original line-up with Lol Coker on organ. On tracks 9-11 and 13, Coker is replaced by Peter Jennings, and on track 13, John Heyworth is replaced by John Culley.)
(tracks 5, 8, 11 and 12 were songs that were not included on the first two albums)
"To Play Your Little Game" (Heyworth) (original demo version; later re-recorded for the first album)
"Winter Is Coming Again" (Heyworth) (original demo version; later re-recorded for the first album)
"Cressida" (Cullen) (original demo version; later re-recorded for the first album)
"Depression" (Cullen) (original demo version; later re-recorded for the first album)
"Sad Eyed Fairy" (Cullen)  (original demo version; not included on any album and previously unreleased)
"Lights In My Mind" (Heyworth) (original demo version; later re-recorded for the first album)
"Let Them Come When They Will" (Heyworth) (original demo version; later re-recorded in an extended version for the second album)
"Situation" (Heyworth)  (original demo version; later re-recorded for a single which was never released)
"The Only Earthman In Town" (Heyworth) (original demo version; later re-recorded for the first album)
"Down Down" (Heyworth) (original demo version; later re-recorded for the first album)
"Mental State" (Heyworth) (original demo version; not included on any album and previously unreleased)
"Silent Light" (Cullen) (original demo version; not included on any album and previously unreleased)
"Situation" (Alternate Version) (Heyworth) (unissued single)

2012 - The Vertigo Years Anthology 1969-1971 (Esoteric)
Disc 1 includes all tracks from the first, self-titled album, plus :
"Lights In My Mind" (Demo) (Heyworth)
"Mental State" (Demo) (Heyworth)
Disc 2 includes all tracks from Asylum plus :
"Situation" (Previously Unreleased) (Heyworth)
"Depression" (BBC Sounds Of The Seventies) (Cullen)
"Winter Is Coming Again" (BBC Sounds Of The Seventies) (Heyworth)

Covers
A cover version of "Goodbye Post Office Tower Goodbye" was recorded by New Zealand band
Powerhouse (Move On Up: The Unreleased 1972 HMV Tapes).

External links
 Official 'Cressida' website
 Review of 'Cressida' album
 Band overview
 Most of the information contained herein came from a Cressida profile/interview in the UK fanzine Ptolemaic Terrascope.

English progressive rock groups
Vertigo Records artists